The Melbourne Renegades (WBBL) are an Australian women's Twenty20 cricket team based in St Kilda, Victoria. They are one of two teams from Melbourne to compete in the Women's Big Bash League, the other being the Melbourne Stars.

History

Formation
One of eight founding WBBL teams, the Melbourne Renegades are aligned with the men's team of the same name. On 3 June 2015, Cricket Victoria announced Lachlan Stevens would "take charge of one of Melbourne's two WBBL teams". Stevens would be confirmed as inaugural head coach of the Renegades in the following months.  At the official WBBL launch on 10 July, Sarah Elliott was unveiled as the team's first ever signing. Elliott would also become the inaugural captain.

The Renegades played their first match against the Hobart Hurricanes at Aurora Stadium in Launceston on 11 December, losing by 35 runs. It took until their fifth match, a 20 December encounter with the Brisbane Heat at the Gabba, to register a win.

Rivalries

Sydney Sixers
The Renegades and Sydney Sixers have combined to produce some of the most "thrilling" and "controversial" matches in the league's history, particularly revolving around close finishes, including:
3 January 2018, GMHBA Stadium: In "bizarre" scenes, Sixers batter Sarah Aley attempted to score a game-tying run on the last delivery despite Renegades wicket-keeper Emma Inglis, having received the ball over the stumps from fielder Kris Britt and thus believing the match to be over, already celebrating victory. After deliberation, officiating umpires deemed the ball was not dead and the run would be allowed, thereby forcing a super over which the Renegades nevertheless went on to win.
19 January 2019, Drummoyne Oval: In the Renegades' first finals appearance, with three runs required off the last ball for an upset victory, Sophie Molineux was short of her ground attempting the winning run due to a "miracle" piece of team fielding by Sixers players Erin Burns, Sarah Aley and Alyssa Healy. In the resulting super over, Sixers captain Ellyse Perry hit a six off Molly Strano to eliminate the Renegades from the tournament. The match, in conjunction with the other semi-final played earlier in the day, was hailed as a showcase of "the irrefutable rise of women's cricket" and "sport with drama, skill and unpredictability – a potent recipe for success".
17 November 2019, Drummoyne Oval: The Renegades, requiring 28 runs off the last 12 balls with only three wickets in hand, pulled off a "great escape" victory against the Sixers through a last-ball six from Courtney Webb against the bowling of Marizanne Kapp. It marked the first time a WBBL team had won a match when needing more than four runs off the final legal delivery. The ramifications of the result were season-shaping as the Renegades went on to edge out the Sixers for fourth spot on the ladder, making it the first season the Sixers would fail to qualify for finals.

Melbourne Stars
The Renegades hold an 8–4 record over their cross-town rivals, the Melbourne Stars. Noteworthy matches include:
1 January 2017, Melbourne Cricket Ground: Played in front of a reported crowd of 24,547—as part of a double-header with the men's BBL, setting a new record for the highest non-standalone WBBL attendance—the rain-affected match ended in anticlimactic fashion with the Renegades adjudged nine-wicket winners via the Duckworth–Lewis–Stern method. Stars captain Meg Lanning initially protested the ruling with officiating umpires, claiming she had been given false information about the par score by the match referee.
20 January 2018, Melbourne Cricket Ground: Chasing 119 for victory, Renegades captain Amy Satterthwaite—who looked to have been run out earlier in the innings and left the field, but was recalled after TV replays showed wicket-keeper Nicole Faltum had dislodged the bails prematurely—hit a six off the final delivery against the bowling of Georgia Elwiss to tie the game. With scores still level after the super over, the Stars were awarded the win on the boundary count back rule.
29 December 2018, Docklands Stadium: The Renegades recorded the second one-wicket victory in the league's history when Lea Tahuhu, a fast bowler not known for her batting ability, hit the winning single off Stars captain Kristen Beams with just one ball to spare. Courtney Webb, on 21 not out, was the set batter at the non-striker's end.

Brisbane Heat
Despite winning multiple championships in the league's early years, the Brisbane Heat have relatively struggled against the Renegades. Across the competition's first five seasons, the Renegades were the only team to beat the Heat more often than not. Noteworthy matches include:
23 December 2017, Docklands Stadium: Batting first, the Heat were bowled out for 66, equalling the WBBL record for lowest all out total. The Renegades chased the target down with ten wickets in hand and 55 balls remaining, also setting a new WBBL record for largest victory by a team batting second.
27 November 2019, Allan Border Field: Targeting 184 runs to win, the Renegades set a new WBBL record for highest successful chase by sealing victory with six wickets in hand and six balls remaining.
7 December 2019, Allan Border Field: The Heat, on their way to a second consecutive title, chased down the Renegades' total of 4/163 with four wickets and 12 balls to spare in the first-ever semi-final encounter between the two teams. Wicket-keeper Josie Dooley, having won a championship with Brisbane in the previous season, top-scored for the Renegades with 50 not out.

Captaincy records

There have been eight captains in the Renegades' history, including matches featuring an acting captain.

Source:

Season summaries

Home grounds

Players

Current squad

Australian representatives
 The following is a list of cricketers who have played for the Renegades after making their debut in the national women's team (the period they spent as both a Renegades squad member and an Australian-capped player is in brackets):

Overseas marquees
The following is a list of cricketers who have played for the Renegades as overseas marquees:

Associate rookies

Statistics and awards

Team stats
Champions: 0 
Runners-up: 0
Minor premiers: 0
 Win–loss record:

 Highest score in an innings: 4/207 (20 overs) vs Brisbane Heat, 6 November 2021
 Highest successful chase: 4/185 (19 overs) vs Brisbane Heat, 27 November 2019
 Lowest successful defence: 110 (20 overs) vs Sydney Thunder, 7 November 2020
 Largest victory:
 Batting first: 48 runs vs Melbourne Stars, 1 January 2019
 Batting second: 55 balls remaining vs Brisbane Heat, 23 December 2017
 Longest winning streak: 4 matches
 Longest losing streak: 6 matches (18 October – 3 November 2022)

Source:

Individual stats
 Most runs: Sophie Molineux – 1,506
 Highest score in an innings: Danni Wyatt – 87 (55) vs Brisbane Heat, 27 November 2019
 Highest partnership: Sophie Molineux and Emma Inglis – 102* vs Hobart Hurricanes, 14 January 2018
 Most wickets: Molly Strano – 104
 Best bowling figures in an innings: Molly Strano – 5/15 (4 overs) vs Melbourne Stars, 2 January 2016

 Most catches (fielder): Sophie Molineux – 35
 Most dismissals (wicket-keeper): Josie Dooley – 38 (27 catches, 11 stumpings)

Source:

Individual awards
 Player of the Match:
 Sophie Molineux – 11
 Danni Wyatt – 6
 Amy Satterthwaite – 5
 Jess Duffin, Molly Strano – 4 each
 Harmanpreet Kaur, Rachel Priest – 3 each
 Courtney Webb – 2
 Maitlan Brown, Grace Harris, Erica Kershaw, Anna Lanning, Lizelle Lee, Carly Leeson, Georgia Prestwidge, Jemimah Rodrigues, Georgia Wareham – 1 each
 WBBL Player of the Tournament:
Amy Satterthwaite – WBBL03
Harmanpreet Kaur  – WBBL07
 WBBL Team of the Tournament:
Molly Strano (3) – WBBL02, WBBL04, WBBL05
 Jess Duffin – WBBL|05
 Harmanpreet Kaur – WBBL07
Sophie Molineux – WBBL|04
 Amy Satterthwaite – WBBL03
 Lea Tahuhu – WBBL|03
 Danni Wyatt – WBBL|05
 WBBL Young Gun Award:
Sophie Molineux – WBBL03
 Georgia Wareham – WBBL04

Sponsors

See also

Melbourne Stars (WBBL)
Victorian Cricket Association
Victorian Spirit

References

Notes

External links
 

 
Women's Big Bash League teams
Cricket clubs in Melbourne
Cricket clubs in Victoria (Australia)
Cricket clubs established in 2015
2015 establishments in Australia
Cricket in Melbourne
Sport in the City of Port Phillip